Benkehøa is a mountain on the border of Skjåk Municipality in Innlandet county and Rauma Municipality in Møre og Romsdal county, Norway. The mountain is surrounded by several other notable mountains including Storhøa to the east, Digerkampen and Dørkampen to the southeast, Høggøymen to the south, Veltdalseggi to the southwest, and Karitinden to the west.

See also
List of mountains of Norway

References

Skjåk
Rauma, Norway
Mountains of Innlandet
Mountains of Møre og Romsdal